Social media and television have a number of connections and interrelationships that have led to the phenomenon of Social Television, which is an emerging communication digital technology that centers around real-time interactivity involving digital media displayed on television. The main idea behind Social Television is to make television consumption a more active content experience for audiences. In the 2010s, social media platforms and websites allow for television shows to be accessed online on a range of desktop and mobile computer devices, smartphones and smart TVs that are still evolving today in the 2020s . Alongside this, online users can use social media websites to share digital video clips or excerpts from TV shows with fellow fans or even share an entire show online. Many social media websites enable users to post online comments on the programs—both negative and positive—in a variety of ways. Viewers can actively participate while watching a TV program by posting comments online, and have their interactions viewed and responded to in real time by other viewers. Technologies such as smartphones, tablets, and laptop computers allow viewers to watch downloaded digital files of TV shows or "stream" digital files of TV shows on a range of devices, both in the home and while on the go. In the 2020s, many television producers and broadcasters encourage active social media participation by viewers by posting "hashtags" on the TV screen during shows; these hashtags enable viewers to post online comments about the show, which may either be read by other social media users, or even, in some cases, displayed on the screen during the show.

In contrast to pre-Internet TV viewing, which typically took place in a family room of a private home, in the 2020s, digital and Internet technologies enable viewers to watch shows anytime, anywhere, regardless of the over-the-air television air times. For example, when a TV show is made available on a streaming service, viewers can watch the show on any day and at any time, and even on multiple screens at once Viewers with Internet-enabled mobile devices can even stream or download and watch a TV show while using different means of transportation. Television stations and programs have taken advantage of this new accessibility by incorporating aspects of social media into their programming, such as indicating social media websites where viewers and fans can post comments or participate in online activities. TV show producers are also using viewer comments from social media to improve their content or modify their marketing campaigns. TV show producers are also releasing video clips from live TV, including promotional trailers and excerpts from shows on popular social media platforms, including Facebook, Instagram, Twitter and Snapchat in order to generate additional advertising revenue and increase Internet users' awareness of and interest in their show. In some cases, social media marketing may be more effective at reaching a target market and less expensive than using "traditional" marketing approaches for TV shows, such as TV commercials. At the same time, TV shows using social media may face certain risks, as Internet users can post negative comments about the show online. In comparison with traditional marketing platforms, over which advertisers generally have a high level of control (e.g., a TV commercial), with social media, regular viewers can post critical comments directly under a TV show's online advertisement on a social media website.

Promotion
Programs must decide, and promote a single "hashtag" for a show which in turn becomes the show's official hashtag when fans post online comments about it. For example, the hashtag for Fox's Glee is #glee; for shows with longer titles such as FX network's American Horror Story, an abbreviated hashtag is created, #AHSFX. Some shows get creative with their hashtags. For example, Showtime's Shameless uses #TeamGallagher to promote their show, deriving from Gallagher being the last name of the family in the show. A show's hashtag is usually placed on the lower corners of the screen during new airings of the show in order to help guide viewers who want to make online comments. The first official integration between Twitter hashtags and television programs was during Comedy Central's March 15, 2011 roast of Donald Trump. Using the hashtag #TrumpRoast at the bottom of the screen, Twitter called it "the single deepest integration of a Twitter hashtag on air-ever." The promotion worked, as it generated the channel's most-watched Tuesday in history; the hashtag #trumproast was used over 27,000 times on Twitter during the show's initial broadcast.

With the rise of online digital media platforms such as YouTube, Twitter, Facebook, Instagram and the increasing utilization and devotion of time to these channels in households, the attention is turned away from traditional media forms, particularly television. Pagani and Mirabello (2012) explain that this global shift in media preference has forced advertisers to brainstorm new, innovative ways of targeting the customer since traditional media may not be the most effective channel anymore. Social media enables viewers to distract themselves while adverts are playing; thus, fewer people are watching television advertisements and the advertisers' clients are those who suffer in response.

In the modern world of social networks and growing Internet stores that sell products and services online, this people-organization chains are used by social media. Social media marketing gives users a high degree of confidence about the information posted by their real life or online friends, and by trusted opinion leaders. The trust that people place in their relationship chain reassures users with a higher degree of confidence in recommendations by friends and acquaintances online. Taking advantage of the social relationship chain allows advertisers to make use of the benefits of social media and television marketing. There are several enterprises to broaden viewer's awareness of their product such as Facebook, Twitter and other social networking sites. According to social media facts and statistics, "93% of marketers use social media for business." Social media enables companies to collect a lot of information about users and non-users. These parameters are not only reserved to just age, race, and occupation. By analyzing the content which users share, retailers can effectively determine the user's preferences, habits, purchasing power, purchasing patterns and other information. In addition, retailing is buying and selling both goods and consumer services.

Social Television also gives advertisers and marketers the direct means to take advantage of "social shows", which are television programs that produce a high number of online social engagement. The more viewers are actively engaging in social, online chit-chat about the television show while watching the show live, the more room marketers have for promoting their products during commercials. Having a large group of people invested in live television programs means that high levels of engagement directly benefit marketers. In other words, "Consumers' multiscreen activities can be used to attract more viewers, to leverage TV campaigns to increase sales". However, Fossen & Schweidel found through their study that online conversations about popular programs such as ABC's Modern Family, Two and a Half Men, CBS's NCIS: Los Angeles, and ABC's 20/20 generate multiplatform chit-chat that often carry through commercial breaks. Consequently, this may interfere with advertising messages in terms of viewer engagement which makes it harder for advertisers to promote their products during commercial breaks. On the other hand, the study also found that many programs such as CW's Supernatural and ABC's Scandal have both the advertised brand and program reporting more online WOM following advertisements. Going alongside this, it was found that advertiser-related WOM on online platforms varied based on the product's category. For example, Fossen & Schweidel found that movie advertisements, and ads for latest phones and technologies produced the highest amount of online brand WOM during live television shows. It's also clear that hashtags play an effective role in television advertisements. According to the study, if an advertisement includes a hashtag, online WOM increases by 3%.

Shazam, a musical recognition app, is a social media and television asset from Silicon Valley. On a technical level, the app can listen to monophonic music which "can be represented by one-dimensional strings of characters, where each character describes one note or one pair of consecutive notes." The app allows users to identify any song is seconds. These characters are part of long-coded algorithms which exist as songs in Shazam's vast catalogue. For every song, Shazam has a different algorithm. Advertisers send Shazam algorithms of the audio from their commercials. When television viewers see a product they like and want to know more about, individuals can Shazam the commercial and be redirected to the company's website about the product.

Interactive media such as Amazon's Alexa and Apple's Siri have enabled computers to interact with people in human-like ways. "Computers, in the way that they communicate, instruct and take turns interacting, are close enough to humans that they encourage social responses. The encouragement is necessary for such a reaction need not be much. As long as there are some behaviors that suggest a social presence, people will respond accordingly." Amazon's Alexa is far from being just a smart speaker and now has over 700,000 commands that it can carry out from multiple different devices. Considering that Alexa's goal is to make people's lives more convenient and high-tech, Alexa can also take commands involving the television with just an individuals voice alone. According to Amazon's blog, Amazon "sold tens of millions of Echo devices" in 2018 alone and the numbers are only going up three years later. Along with this, popular companies such as Sony and Lenovo have introduced a wide variety of different devices since 2018, such as the Fire Tablet, Fire Cube, Echo Show, and Echo Dot that can all be connected to a television in order to implement social commands. According to Amazon's blog, these devices bring the opportunity for individuals to have a social relationship with their television in ways that allow one to control their television content with just their voice alone.

Approaches 

The exponential growth in the number of social media users between 2006 and 2016 has impacted how television shows are marketed. Furthermore, the huge increase in social media use has changed how show producers and broadcasters interact and connect with their audiences on a national or even a global scale. The Internet also allows instantaneous newsfeeds and posts, regardless of location or time differences. TV ratings agency Nielsen found that on average, 42% of respondents in a social media survey connect and communicate through digital media because they are interested in keeping up to date about their favorite shows (2012). The increasing efficiency and ease of access to digital devices has enabled more direct interaction between television show producers and their audiences and fans. One study describes this interaction between a brand and their audience as "touchpoints", which are the "various contact points at which brands appear in public and are experienced by (potential) clients". The phrase "appear in public" refers to the broad range of public events that brands and companies can use to promote their brands, products and services, ranging from celebrity appearances at events, media tours, TV commercials, billboard ads and online marketing.

Due to the phenomenon of enabling the "social practice of commenting on television shows with peers, friends, and unknown people", most audiences are all somewhat connected through the captivating world of digital media. Selva explains that television has transitioned from traditional media where dialogue is conveyed in a linear form, from the source to the receiver; to social and interactive media, where viewers have the power to "navigate content, access on-demand services, and customize supply" which is in theory, non-linear communication. This study also found that "Almost 40% of TV viewers discuss particular TV shows via social media while they're watching them." Furthermore, Selva claims that "This is evidenced by the average 4.5 million tweets from this year's Super Bowl viewers." The earliest form of social interactive television was that of BBC's "Any Questions?" which allowed viewers to call in via telephone, whereas, now there are various other forms in which television can touchpoint their audience. The arrival off social media platforms has switched 'the market-customer interface, empowering customers to engage directly with the organization in both personal and real-time exchanges'.

Television networks benefit from audience interest being generated naturally through fans posting links and comments online. A plan for increasing Internet traffic related to a single show is the placement of hashtags on the screen during dramatic moments of the show, for example NBC's reality competition The Voice places #TheVoice on the screen during the part of the show where contestants get eliminated.  Another effective way to increase web traffic is to use what is called a "madlib" hashtag, which is a hashtag that goes at the beginning of a post that starts a sentence a user can then finish. An example of this is the hashtag #WhatWillGagaWear used by MTV at the 2011 Video Music Awards where viewers could speculate what they thought musician/performer Lady Gaga would wear to the event. Some shows create hashtags for promotional purposes. While advertising the fifth season of Jersey Shore, MTV used promos with various hashtags related to events in the show to generate an audience buzz. In addition to hashtags, programs can also create their own Twitter accounts. Often used for talk shows, or shows that have a host, similar to a hashtag, the program places @ followed by the specific Twitter "handle" at the bottom of the screen. CNN's Piers Morgan Tonight showed his Twitter handle @piersmorgan twice during a show, which generated 4,500 new followers as an immediate result. Accounts also make it possible for hosts to live-tweet during a prerecorded program. Comedy Central's Tosh.0 host Daniel Tosh live-tweets via his Twitter account @danieltosh during new airings of his show. Jeff Probst, host of CBS' Survivor, did not live-tweet at all during the show's 2010 season. In spring 2011, using the Twitter handle @JeffProbst, his live-tweeting during new episodes of the show dramatically increased online traffic related to the show.

Fox's crime drama Bones, under the Twitter handle @BONESonFOX, makes a major effort to interact with fans and followers and engage them via social media. In addition to being able to post on the back channel, followers of the Twitter account can use it to find and download music that is played during the program. The account also makes an effort to re-tweet and reply to fan comment posts using the hashtag #bones in their posts. Bones' actors and creative team also hold live tweet sessions where followers can tweet questions about the show. The HBO program True Blood has taken Twitter a step further by creating Twitter accounts for the fictional characters on the show. Using the tag #TrueBlood, these characters' tweets use dialogue specific to how they speak on the show. Unlike other, unofficial character Twitter accounts, all of the True Blood character accounts are created and maintained by HBO. A cottage industry has sprung up around facilitating TV stations interaction with viewers. Companies like Mass Relevance, Never.no TV Interact and Vidpresso all aim to help broadcasters more easily use social media.

Movies and televsion in the structure of video is commonly given to the home market in bundles. Netflix is one of the biggest examples, delivering 4,210 movies and 798 television series in the United States digitally for only $7.99 per month.

Creating two-way dialogues 
Interactive television in a non-linear sense has the ability to empower the regular, sole viewer as they have the opportunity to share their opinion in an open forum that may be seen by huge numbers of users. Typically the message is encoded on-screen for a short period of time when audience participation is welcomed. Selva (2016) describes this empowerment as identity-building for the purpose of creating social awareness, real-time fact checking, or perhaps dealing with conversational topics. Users can also provide feedback almost instantaneously, as digital media enhances the efficiency and openness of the communication flow. Thus, the non-linear model of communication suggests that television shows of in the 2010s tend to prosper from social media's two-way dialogue stream.

Moreover, social media has radically influenced and enhanced the way viewers engage with other viewers and fans. "TV viewers can follow their favorite programs, share TV-related content and reactions, and connect with fellow viewers before, during, and after a program". According to another study, many people use social media platforms whilst watching television to feel as though they are not alone or to "compensate for the absence of other people in the physical realm of the living room and to have the chance to control others' reactions". For example, Twitter is a popular social media platform that enhances television viewing due to its requirement of social media communities that have individuals participating on the same platforms at the same time. In other words, social media is in the midst of creating a "group viewing" dynamic. Twitter's famous functionalities of re-tweets and hashtags make known that viewers have a desire to be part of a larger group even though the individuals themselves are not interacting directly with anyone specific. This is particularly prominent in shows such as political debates, a sports match or reality TV, due to the dramatic, controversial nature of the content. Lim et al. suggests that there are three levels of engagement by combined TV/social media users; functional, emotional and communal. Viewers appreciate the opportunity to share their opinion because as emotional beings, humans seek to have a sense of belonging; to think they might find other people who share the same views as they do. In their studies, Lin, Sung and Chen found a direct correlation between audience emotional engagement and television channel loyalty; thus, audience engagement and participation is paramount to maintaining viewer consistency in television.

Reality Television and Social TV 
RTV is an exceedingly dominant aspect of today's media culture and modern television environment. It focuses primarily on unscripted interaction of nonprofessional actors that are framed as everyday individuals. Reality Television is an exceedingly vast part of American popular culture and has infiltrated the social conversations that take place on social media due to the resulting virtual communities that have revolutionized the media sphere and the use of television, specifically. Not only this, but researchers have also found a direct correlation between Reality Television, viewership and increased time spent on social media as a whole. In other words, "Media is no longer solely a dictated thing by producers because consumers have been given platforms to express opinion and a sense of agency and influence. Television is one of the most active form of media within social networking sites, specifically, reality television and Instagram". The switch of "regular people into celebrities" whose every move is deserving of a mass audience's attention was a high powered concept. With certain components of RTV diverge, it is probable to identify broad generic values of RV programming content. For example, when actors commonly participate in "confession" where they ritualistically disclose their private feelings and thoughts to a national audience.

One aspect of the relationship between reality television and social TV is the ability to create virtual communities. Although virtual platforms operate without a traditional face-to-face contact, online communities are just as capable of producing a sense of belonging and togetherness as offline interactions. With that being said, online communities have the ability to connect people from all across the globe, something that is not easily as possible in person. Instead of being bonded through physical location, virtual communities on social media provide a focal point of shared interests that drive personal connections. With that being said, "the criteria for this sense includes a feeling of membership, ability to exert an amount of influence, integration, fulfillment of needs, and shared emotional connection". In regards to reality television, fans of their favorite programs with access to the internet or social media platforms can easily fulfill these requirements. This gives them the satisfaction of contributing to a community, as well as consuming as a group. Reality television productions also contribute to their fans' online, social media communities by providing them with various interactive content such as polling, Q&A's, countdowns, fan voting, etc during live broadcasts and in between weekly episodes. Considering statistics show that television shows with strong social media presence perform better when it comes to television ratings than those without, many reality television productions become responsible for keeping their fans engaged with captivating social media content that they can interact with. Utilizing these features brings attention to the major shift in power from producers to consumers, which is a result of Web 2.0 and its participatory nature. This is also a result of transformational methods of advertising, and promotion on television alone due to its connection with social media.

Research also shows a consistent relationship between RTV consumption and how an individual uses their social media platforms. For instance, many heavy consumers of reality television are exposed to consistent notions about the benefit of "celebrity culture" and are more likely to spend time closely managing their online identities, as well as more motivated to expand their online communities. Web 2.0 platforms provide individuals with the possibility to "mediate' themselves, and reach out to communities on the same level as influencers, fashion models, movie stars, etc. considering that reality television pushes the narrative that anyone can become a public celebrity. Alongside this, "Even now, with the presence of social media, the world of high-class celebrity is fundamentally removed from their audience and the relationship is hardly reciprocal. People are used to interacting with detached mediated personalities, feeling they know celebrities intimately and can discuss them as such". Also, the more reality TV a person consumes, the more likely they are to friend strangers and post pictures at a higher frequency than non-reality TV viewers. "Promiscuous friending" is the phrase used to describe the viewers mimicking the behaviors of their reality TV stars. Friending and following random online users has been an increasing trend over the past decade. The reason for this could be, "fame-seeking behavior that is modeled by RTV characters. Having a large social network on a SNS site can be construed as a sign of popularity (being at the center of a large social network), and conversely as a sign of superficiality."

Role of intermediaries 
On viewer-to-viewer engagement, Dahlen, Lange, and Smith (2010) analyze the hierarchal effects of "intermediaries" in the model of communication. These intermediaries are "Opinion Leaders": "regularly perceived by their immediate peer group to embody the characteristics of an innovator, a socialite and to be of a higher social status"; as well as "Opinion Formers": "Considered to be official specialists in the product area". Both groups of people are extremely influential in shaping the opinions of audiences due to their hierarchal power in society. Social media makes it easier for Opinion Leaders in particular, to have their opinions heard and adhered to by their fans as they take the role of "filtering messages from the sender to receiver, occupying a position of informal influence over the attitude of others." In social television, the influence of Opinion Leaders can come across as taking a biased stance, particularly for collection of data purposes (e.g. polls).

Facebook
Through the evolution of Facebook as the top social networking site, television programs have taken advantage of the large number of users by creating pages for users to "like". By clicking on the "like" button, this indicates that viewers have a favorable view of content regarding the show.  After clicking "like" on a page it will then show up under the user's interests. Television programs take advantage of this by creating exclusive posts that only those who "like" the page can see. The pages post updates that include air-times of new episodes, preview and behind the scenes clips, merchandise and coupon opportunities, and interviews with the show's actors and directors. Access to exclusive content entices Facebook users to "like" the pages of their favorite shows. As of May 2011, 275 million users "liked" a television show page on Facebook. The average users "liked" at least six shows leading to an average of 1.65 billion Likes of television shows. Seventeen of the top 100 most liked pages are television programs with Fox's The Simpsons, Family Guy and Comedy Central's South Park being the top three most "liked" television pages. As of February 2021,The Simpsons, Spongebob Squarepants, and  Family Guy  became the top three most liked television programs with the most fans and "likes" on Facebook, with South Park being bumped down to the fourth most liked show.

In January 2013, Facebook announced the launch of hashtags. Facebook now has clickable links that users will be able to click on and see the stories surrounding that hashtag. Facebook has over 4.7 billion content items shared daily and the hashtags help people to find more people who are talking about the same things as them. The correct definition of a hashtag is an alphanumerical string preceded by the hashtag special character number.

In 2014, the new app Snapchat became more popular than Facebook, Twitter, Instagram, and television. On January 26, 2015 24.79 million people watched a series of videos on their phones, called "Snapchat Stories" about the blizzard of 2015. This beat FOX's Sunday Night Football which had 21 million views, and AMC's The Walking Dead mid-season finale which had 14.8 million views. This statistic shows leading U.S. television series on Twitter ranked by average unique audience in 2015, sorted by the number of average tweets. During this period of time, ABC's Pretty Little Liars generated an average of 222,000 tweets per episode airing. ABC's Scandal was ranked first with an online buzz volume of 559,000 tweets per telecast.

As a result of Snapchats ongoing popularity, Facebook recognized how successful Snapchat was with the launch of Snapchat stories back in 2014, so Facebook launched their own Facebook stories in 2017. This is a way for people to share, for twenty-four hours, what are you doing with your Facebook friends from the mobile app.

Facebook is undeniable "the most all-encompassing social media platform, as once can communicate with others (via video and phone calls, instant messaging) as well as brainstorming ideas, sharing post, purchasing and selling products".

News organizations 
The interrelationship between social media and television has changed the way that news is delivered and consumed. Journalists now have the task of converting their stories into the digital form that is suitable for social media as well as creating content for news programs on air. With social media platforms like Facebook and Twitter, journalists must now market their stories and news organizations by attempting to get shares and likes.  Hard-hitting news is now taking a backseat to fluffy stories that get more shares and likes on social media platforms. News organizations like CNN, Fox News Channel and MSNBC are some of the most popular news destinations on the Internet. These major news organizations use platforms like Facebook and Twitter to their advantage by posting and sharing up-to-date content for their newsreaders. The overall research on journlaism and soical media has multiple homes, including connections to sociology, behavioral economic, and psychology, along with contemporary shadowing in political communication espicaially with media and communication studeis broadly.

With the constant need to share up-to-date information, journalists now have to learn how to market their stories and work to get readers to click on and share their stories. Like the Television news consumers, online news consumers have particular reasons for following certain news organizations and sharing their content. The biggest result behind shares on social media is proximity, "the general finding is that geographical proximity and the involvement of elite nations that are considered culturally proximate increase the news value of a story".

Real-time video posting

In May 2013, Twitter launched Twitter Amplify, allowing television networks and content rights holders to share video clips from major live broadcasts, with advertisers' names and messages playing before the clip. Facebook made changes to its algorithm and introduced video autoplay to drive video consumption and attract content from premium content rights holders such as NFL, NHL, Wimbledon and Fox Sports. It then announced Facebook Suggested Videos, bringing related videos and ads to anyone that clicks on a video. Numerous rights holders now use Grabyo to share clips from live video feeds on Facebook and Twitter. The real-time video editing platform is used by the NHL, Sky Sports, the Brit Awards, Wimbledon, FIFA World Cup, Channel 5, ATP World Tour, Ryder Cup, FIA Formula E Championship and UFC.

During the Covid-19 pandemic, "sporting events were canceled, and staying at home orders were put in place, sports fans were able to engage with professional athletes who have regularly used social media platforms and features such as TikTok and Instagram LIVE from their homes".

Ratings

Social media websites

Studies have shown that leading social media sites such as Twitter have been used to calculate a portion of television ratings. The rise in various devices currently available for viewers to access television content on has caused for the traditional Nielsen ratings system to become outdated and thus no longer capable of generating an accurate depiction of viewership. Functions such as online viewing, recorded DVR content, and live streams over the Internet are not taken into account when calculating television ratings. The Nielsen Media Research took a survey at the end of 2009 which concluded that 59% of Americans simultaneously watched television and accessed the internet at least once per month, spending 3.5 hours of simultaneous use per month. Rating information can be gathered through the social media site's "back-channel". While social media sites, specifically Twitter, have proven to be able to generate television rating numbers there are still limitations to that function. Twitter was not designed to calculate television ratings therefore more work needs to be done to refine the method in order to acquire a look at viewership though the site.

Over the years younger people have been increasingly engaged with social media platforms and technologies. Majority of teens are ‘‘content creators’’ who create websites or blogs, share original media such as photos and videos, or remix content into new creations. During 2020, "social media has been established with mobilizing millions of content creators and various people across the United States to attend various events, such as the Women’s March and the March for Science".

The Grammy Awards provides an example of a direct correlation between back channel traffic and ratings. In 2010 the award show saw a 35% increase in viewers from the previous year's broadcast as a result of social media integration. A more extreme example of a social media ratings boost can be scene with the Oxygen Network's Bad Girls Club whose East Coast premiere saw a 97% ratings increase through social network activity. On the other hand, the West Coast airing, which offered no social element, only saw a 7% from the previous week. However, a large amount of online traffic does not always however translate into high ratings. A study showed that while a large amount of online traffic may circulate on a program it does not necessarily mean that a large audience is physically watching. A report by the Hollywood Reporter showed that most people use social media to determine their choices in entertainment. It also showed that over 50% of people make these decisions to stay in the loop with their peers. Many things people do for entertainment are influenced by what is said on social media.

Online viewership

Television programs such as the CW's Gossip Girl, Supernatural, 90210 and NBC's Community rank fairly low on the Nielsen ratings scale and come in above 100 on the list on 200 most watched programs within original broadcast times. Despite this, each program ranks incredibly high on the 200 most watched programs online list with Gossip Girl being the most watched program online according to SideReel Ranking. On the other end of the spectrum, ratings hits such as CBS' NCIS: Los Angeles, and reality shows such as Fox's American Idol and ABC's Dancing with the Stars have fairly low online viewership while delivering large numbers during original broadcasts. Dramas like Gossip Girl and 90210 are targeted toward teens and young adults while American Idol and NCIS: Los Angeles have a much broader audiences including older viewers. SideReel described the phenomena as saying "Online TV viewers are younger and more discriminating. They're driving consumption away from the TV set to the computer."

Back-channel

Back-channel networks 
The back-channel is the virtual conversation or information shared on a social media website or application by users and fans while a program is airing in real time. Studies show that a significant percentage of TV viewers simultaneously use a computer, smartphone, or other device while they watch TV shows. With the back-channel forums, a distinction has been made between television-show related tweets and posts, that pertain to the show and its stars, and any other information shared that does not pertain to the show (e.g., comments about current political issues made on the back-channel platform for a live sports program). Specific Hashtags, links, re-tweets, and "@" messages are all ways television programs, stations, producers, advertising agencies and brands work to distinguish their content from being mixed in with unrelated content. For example, searching the key word "lost" would provide you with all tweets containing the word as opposed to searching "#Lost" which makes the differential between the television series and the literal word "lost". Television programs are adopting Twitter's back-channel to directly obtain audiences' opinions and views about on-aired programs.  Mobile phones, smartphones, computers, tablets and other devices that can connect to the Internet make it possible to access and contribute to the back-channel anytime, anywhere. A major portion of back channel conversation for a single show occurs during its initial broadcast.Twitter, for example, does not necessarily replace existing media channels themselves, but more or so compliments them, and provides users with alternative ways to contribute to a wider media sphere. Considering that Twitter has been widely recognized as a medium that pushes for audience discussion, interaction, and fandom groups, the app has earned its spot as one of the most popular backchannels through which social activity is made visible.

Drawbacks 
Back-channeling networks can lead to miscommunication. The dynamics of back-channeling provides a system of categorization for the discourse surrounding a topic. The detriments of such a system are also its strengths. This is because the lack of filtration that occurs when searching through back-channeled information can miscommunicate the original message. The presence of false or irrelevant information will remain present within the network and has the potential to be misinterpreted as accurate. The postmodern perspective of back-channel networks describes the correlation between an original source and a back-channeled source.

Professional sports and social media 
People often use social media platforms like Facebook, Instagram and Twitter to interact with and discuss sports. Technology is now so advanced that people no longer have to watch the game live on television. For example, there are apps, like ESPN, that will send users updates on the teams of their choice. People can also follow their favourite sports team on social media platforms like Twitter, Facebook, and Instagram. On those websites, professional teams' accounts post live updates of scores and plays during games and interact as much as they can with their fans and followers. Many professional athletes have social media accounts that they are very active on. Through social media, fans get the chance to follow their favorite players and keep up with their day-to-day life. Teams and players are now able to directly connect with the fans with the help of social media. Players also have to be careful when they use social media because if anything they post is taken in the wrong context, they could suffer huge consequences. For instance, former Villanova basketball player, Donte DiVincenzo, was criticized in 2018 for controversial tweets that he had posted seven years prior when he was fourteen years old.

The national anthem protests during the 2017–2018 football season, where NFL players knelt for the American national anthem drew the attention of social media users. The protests began with former quarterback of the San Francisco 49ers, Colin Kaepernick, who refused to stand during the playing of the national anthem before the start of the game. Kaepernick told NFL Media, "I am not going to stand up to show pride in a flag for a country that oppresses black people and people of color. To me, this is bigger than football and it would be selfish on my part to look the other way. There are bodies in the street and people getting paid leave and getting away with murder." This has caused a lot of controversy within the NFL and across the US. Fans, players, and people all over the country had different reactions, using their social media accounts to voice their opinions and their personal reasons for protesting or for honoring the flag. Some of the most famous athletes that currently play in the NFL, like Tom Brady and Aaron Rodgers, shared Instagram posts supporting their teammates. Social media is a way for athletes to get their message across to their fans as quickly and efficiently as possible.

PhillyVoice.com, through analyzing hashtags on Twitter, concluded that the US was equally divided on this issue. Those who supported the protests included the hashtag #TakeAKnee in their tweets and those who were against them included the hashtag #boycottNFL in their tweets. Because of social media, it was possible to determine the country's opinion on the current issues within the NFL.

See also
Event television

References

Interactive television
Social media
Promotion and marketing communications